is a Japanese manga artist, known for his works Fire Punch and Chainsaw Man.

Early life
Fujimoto was born on October 10, 1992, or 1993, in Nikaho, Akita Prefecture, Japan. He started drawing at an early age. He had no preparatory schools available near his home, so he went to painting classes in which his grandparents attended and practiced oil painting. He graduated in Western painting  from Tohoku University of Art and Design in Yamagata, Yamagata Prefecture in 2014.

Career
In 2011, Fujimoto drew his first submitted one-shot work, which was nominated for the December Jump SQ. Monthly Award (it was later published on the Shōnen Jump+ online platform on July 17, 2017). Fujimoto's one-shot, was an entry work for the 10th Supreme Comic Grand Prize season II in 2013.

Fujimoto published his first major and serialized work, Fire Punch, on Shueisha's Shōnen Jump+ online magazine, where it ran from April 18, 2016, to January 1, 2018. The series spawned eight tankōbon volumes. Fujimoto also published on Shōnen Jump+ the one-shot  on April 24, 2017, and the one-shot  in the June 2018 issue of Jump Square on May 2, 2018.

Fujimoto's second major serialized work, Chainsaw Man, was published in Shueisha's Weekly Shōnen Jump from December 3, 2018, to December 14, 2020. The series was collected in eleven tankōbon volumes. A sequel to the series began its serialization in Shōnen Jump+ on July 13, 2022. Chainsaw Man topped Takarajimasha's Kono Manga ga Sugoi! list of best manga of 2021 for male readers and earned Fujimoto the 66th Shogakukan Manga Award for Best Shōnen Manga. In 2021, the manga won the Harvey Awards for Best Manga; it won the award for the second time in 2022.

Fujimoto illustrated the cover of the novels anthology , released on April 2, 2021. Fujimoto participated as a guest judge at Shonen Jump+s Million Tag online reality show in July 2021.

Fujimoto published the one-shot  on Shōnen Jump+ on July 19, 2021. The chapter was collected by Shueisha in a single tankōbon volume, released on September 3, 2021. Look Back topped the Kono Manga ga Sugoi! 2022 list of best manga for male readers.

A two-volume collection of Fujimoto's previous one-shots, Tatsuki Fujimoto Before Chainsaw Man (subtitled 17–21 and 22–26), were released on October 4 and November 4, 2021, respectively. He illustrated the novel , published on November 4, 2021. Fujimoto illustrated a version of one of the forty-two volumes of the Dragon Ball manga for the Dragon Ball Super Gallery Project, celebrating the series' 40th anniversary, which was published in Saikyō Jump on December 3, 2021.

Fujimoto published , a 200-page one-shot, on Shōnen Jump+ on April 11, 2022. The chapter was collected by Shueisha in a single tankōbon volume, released on July 4, 2022.

Along with illustrator Oto Tōda, Fujimoto published the one-shot  on Shōnen Jump+ on July 4, 2022.

Influences
Fujimoto commented that he wanted to "draw manga like Korean films", citing the 2008 South Korean film The Chaser as example, stating: "the main character chases after the villain, but thirty minutes into the movie, he catches him. This is supposed to happen at the end of the movie, so you keep wondering what will happen next. A lot of people say that in Korean movies they cannot tell what the director is thinking, but actually, if you watch until the end, you will get it. I wanted to make something like that." He also mentioned the 2016 Japanese film Sadako vs. Kayako, Kōji Shiraishi's film series , the 2011 Indonesian film The Raid and Takeshi Kitano's work. He was also influenced by manga authors Hiroaki Samura, Hideki Arai, and Tsutomu Nihei.

Works

Serialized manga
 (2016–2018) — Serialized in Shōnen Jump+ and published by Shueisha in eight volumes
 (2018–present) — Serialized in Weekly Shōnen Jump (2018–2020) and Shōnen Jump+ (2022–present) and published by Shueisha in thirteen volumes

One-shots
 (2013) — Unpublished
 (2013) — Unpublished
 (2021) — Two collected volumes of Fujimoto's earliest one-shots
 (2011)
 (2013)
 (2013) — Later published in Jump SQ.19
 (2014) — Published in Jump SQ.19
 (2014) — Published in Jump SQ.19
 (2015) — Published in Jump Square
 (2017) — Published in Shōnen Jump+
  (2018) — Published in Jump Square
 (2021) — Published in Shōnen Jump+ and collected in one volume
 (2022) — Published in Shōnen Jump+ and collected in one volume
 (2022) — Illustrated by Oto Tōda; published in Shōnen Jump+

Notes

References

External links
 

1992 births
1993 births
Living people
Harvey Award winners
Manga artists from Akita Prefecture